Waang is an Australian species of sandalwood tree.

Waang may also refer to:
Crow (Australian Aboriginal mythology)
 A Malaysian electoral district

See also
WA ANG, the Washington Air National Guard in the United States
Wang (disambiguation)
Whang (disambiguation)